Meghan Elizabeth Klingenberg (born August 2, 1988) is an American soccer player who plays as a defender for Portland Thorns in the National Women's Soccer League (NWSL). A former member of the United States women's national soccer team, she is a one-time FIFA Women's World Cup champion. She has also played for three teams in the Women's Professional Soccer (WPS) league, for Tyresö FF in Sweden's Damallsvenskan and for the Houston Dash in the NWSL.

Early life
Klingenberg was born in Pittsburgh and raised in the suburban north hills of Gibsonia, Pennsylvania. She has a younger brother named Drew who played college soccer at Penn State. She attended Pine-Richland High School from 2003 to 2007 and was the captain of the girls soccer team. In 2005, she helped lead Pine-Richland to the Pennsylvania state high school championship and was an NSCAA All-America selection. She was also named a Parade All-American.

Klingenberg claims she enhanced her soccer skills by practicing Taekwondo, and that the martial art made her a more aggressive player. She is now a black belt.

University of North Carolina
Klingenberg attended the University of North Carolina at Chapel Hill and was a four-year starter for the Tar Heels. She scored 18 career goals with 24 assists. Klingenberg was a highly flexible player, playing on all three lines for UNC.

As a freshman in 2007, she played in 24 games, starting 10, and earned Freshman All-ACC honors. She scored five goals with three assists and was a Soccer America First-Team All-Freshman selection. Klingenberg led UNC freshmen in all offensive categories and was an All-ACC Academic Team selection.

As a sophomore in 2008, she played in 20 games, starting eight, and missed the last six games of the season playing for the US at the FIFA U-20 Women's World Cup in Chile. She tied for second on the team with nine assists and two goals. Klingenberg was named to the ACC All-Academic women's soccer team and the ACC Honor Roll.

As a junior in 2009, she played in 26 games and played 1,668 minutes while scoring five goals with one assist. Klingenberg scored the game-winning goal in a 5–2 triumph over Wake Forest in the NCAA quarterfinals.

As a senior in 2010, she was an NSCAA All-American while playing in all 24 games for the Tar Heels and was fourth on the team with 23 points. She had 11 assists (second on the team),  scored six goals and was named First-Team All-ACC.

Club career

WPS, 2011
In 2011, Klingenberg was selected by the Washington Freedom in the first round of the WPS draft.  After the team was moved to Florida and renamed magicJack, she was traded in early June to the Boston Breakers. Klingenberg played 10 matches for Boston, starting them all and totaling 961 minutes for the season. She ended the season with one goal and two assists. She also spent time at Western New York Flash where she won the 2012 Women's Premier Soccer League Elite.

Tyresö FF, 2012–13
In 2012, Klingenberg signed with Swedish club, Tyresö. During her time with Tyresö she won the 2012 Damallsvenskan.

NWSL, 2013
After the WPS folded, the National Women's Soccer League was created with support from the US, Canada, and Mexico.

Houston Dash, 2014–2015
On January 10, 2014, it was announced that the Houston Dash had selected Klingenberg with the sixth pick in the 2014 NWSL Expansion Draft. She finished UEFA Women's Champions League with Tyresӧ FF, before joining the Dash mid-season. She left in October 2015 after making nineteen appearances for the club.

Portland Thorns, 2016–
In October 2015, Klingenberg was part of a pingpong trade that had her join the Seattle Reign as she was traded by Houston Dash for Amber Brooks and a conditional selection in the 2017 NWSL College Draft, then traded to the NWSL 2016 expansion team Orlando, who then traded her to the Portland Thorns FC for Alex Morgan and other considerations.

International career

Klingenberg has played for the United States women's national soccer team at the U-16, U-17, U-20 and U-23 levels. She received her first call-up to the senior squad for the 2011 Four Nations Tournament and earned her first two caps during the event. She was named an alternate for the 2012 Summer Olympics. In March 2013, she was named to the senior team roster by US WNT coach, Tom Sermanni for upcoming exhibition matches against Germany and the Netherlands.
Klingenberg made her debut for senior team on January 23, 2011, at the Four Nations Tournament against Canada, coming in as a substitute at seventy-eighth minute. She also played in the 2015 FIFA Women's World Cup. The United States women's national soccer team won the tournament on July 5, 2015. Klingenberg started in every match of the tournament for the team. Despite seeing extensive playing time during the 2016 Summer Olympics, Klingenberg would receive sparse minutes throughout 2017 and has not been called up since January 2018.

International goals

Career statistics
.

Honors
Klingenberg has won five trophies in her career so far. She has won the 2012 Damallsvenskan with Tyresö, the 2012 Women's Premier Soccer League Elite with Western New York Flash, and the 2017 National Women's Soccer League with Portland Thorns FC . She's also won the 2012 CONCACAF Women's Olympic Qualifying Tournament, 2015 FIFA Women's World Cup and 2016 CONCACAF Women's Olympic Qualifying Championship with the United States women's national soccer team.

Club
Western New York Flash
Women's Premier Soccer League Elite: 2012

Tyresö
Damallsvenskan: 2012

Portland Thorns FC
NWSL Shield: 2016, 2021
NWSL Championship: 2017, 2022
 NWSL Community Shield: 2020
 NWSL Challenge Cup: 2021
 International Champions Cup: 2021

Personal
NWSL Second XI: 2017

International
United States
CONCACAF Women's Championship: 2014
Algarve Cup: 2015
FIFA Women's World Cup: 2015
CONCACAF Women's Olympic Qualifying Tournament: 2016
SheBelieves Cup: 2016

Individual
 FIFPro: FIFA FIFPro World XI 2015

Off-field
While with the Houston Dash, Klingenberg and teammate Morgan Brian lived with the family of former Houston Rockets coach Jeff Van Gundy during the NWSL season, as part of the Dash's host family program. In 2019, Klingenberg, along with United States teammates Tobin Heath, Christen Press and Megan Rapinoe started Re-inc, a gender-neutral lifestyle brand.

In popular culture
Klingenberg was featured with her national teammates in the EA Sports' FIFA video game series in FIFA 16, the first time women players were included in the game.

Following the United States' win at the 2015 FIFA Women's World Cup, Klingenberg and her teammates became the first women's sports team to be honored with a ticker tape parade in New York City. Each player received a key to the city from Mayor Bill de Blasio. In October of the same year, the team was honored by President Barack Obama at the White House.

References

Match reports

External links

 
 US Soccer player profile
 North Carolina player profile
 2012 Summer Olympics alternate player profile
 Tyresö FF player profile
 Houston Dash player profile
 Portland Thorns FC player profile
 

1988 births
2015 FIFA Women's World Cup players
American expatriate sportspeople in Sweden
American female taekwondo practitioners
American people of German descent
Women's association football defenders
Women's association football fullbacks
Women's association football midfielders
Boston Breakers players
Damallsvenskan players
Expatriate women's footballers in Sweden
Houston Dash players
Living people
MagicJack (WPS) players
National Women's Soccer League players
North Carolina Tar Heels women's soccer players
Soccer players from Pittsburgh
Tyresö FF players
United States women's international soccer players
Washington Freedom players
Women's Premier Soccer League Elite players
Women's Professional Soccer players
FIFA Women's World Cup-winning players
Pine-Richland High School alumni
American women's soccer players
Portland Thorns FC players
Footballers at the 2016 Summer Olympics
Olympic soccer players of the United States
United States women's under-20 international soccer players